The universal nut sheller (UNS; formerly called the Malian peanut sheller) is a simple hand-operated machine capable of shelling up to  of raw, sun-dried peanuts per hour.

It requires less than $10 USD in materials to make, and is made of concrete poured into two simple fibreglass molds, some metal parts, one wrench, and any piece of rock or wood that can serve as a hammer. It accepts a wide range of nut sizes without adjustment. Operators can make necessary adjustments quickly and easily. It is estimated that one Universal Nut Sheller will serve the needs of a village of 2,000 people. The life expectancy of the machine is around 25 years.

The Full Belly Project is working to establish local, sustainable businesses that manufacture and distribute appropriate technologies such as the Universal Nut Sheller.

History 

In 2001 Jock Brandis traveled to Mali to fix a small village's water treatment system. While there he met a woman who informed him that it would be of great service to her village if he could find an affordable peanut sheller for them. Upon returning to the United States he contacted peanut authority Dr. Tim Williams of UGA, who told Brandis of a Bulgarian peanut shelling design. Jock adapted the design with help from a friend, Wes Perry. Jock went through several iterations of a redesign and one year later he completed the  machine which is now called the Universal Nut Sheller.

In 2003 Brandis teamed up with a group of returned Peace Corps volunteers from Wilmington, North Carolina, to form the Full Belly Project, dedicated to designing and distributing unique appropriate technologies in developing countries.

Operation 

The user loads the desired crop in the space at the top. The user turns the handle, which rotates the rotor continuously.  This movement facilitates the nuts falling down the gradually narrowing gap. The shell of each nut is broken at the point where the gap is sufficiently narrow and the rotor motion causes sufficient friction to crack open the shell.  The adjustable minimum width of the gap allows a range of nut sizes to be shelled. The kernels and shell fragments fall into a basket and are later separated by winnowing.  The device works best for Jatropha curcas, shea, dried coffee, and peanuts (ground nuts).

The Full Belly Project has developed a pedal powered agricultural processor, which places the universal nut sheller onto a pedaling chassis. In addition to the shelling method described, the pedaling apparatus is connected to a fan. The fan automatically winnows the harvest (separates the shells from the nuts).  The pedal powered versions are capable of shelling the same variety of crops as the hand crank powered versions.  The processor also provides access for the winnowing section to be used independently from the sheller.  This allows winnowing of crops that are not shelled, including rice, maize, and sorghum.

Problems 

The universal nut sheller has been less than successful in Ghana. First hand accounts relate almost universal breakage. Users can mitigate this breakage by pouring the nuts through initially at very broad settings and only later at finer settings, this practice does not eliminate the breakage and destroys the efficiency aspect. Groundnut shelling tends to be a social activity everyone engages in during their down time and there is rarely a need for a peanut sheller.

The Universal Nut Sheller proved incapable of shelling shea nuts in a manner useful for shea butter extraction for the shea nuts of Ghana.  However, there are reports that it works for shea nuts from trees in Uganda.

The cost also proved a significant barrier.  It simply costs far more to produce (even excepting the cost of the mold, transport of materials to the village, travel to the nearest town to find someone capable of welding the metal parts, etc.) than individual growers were able to pay. However, growers unions who made the investment have been successful.

Awards 

 1st place - Popular Mechanics 2006 Breakthrough Awards.

See also 
 Food technology
Sanoussi Diakité

References

External links 
Video of Universal Nut Sheller in Uganda
Full Belly Project - non-profit organization which designs and distributes appropriate technology, including the Universal Nut Sheller
Peanuts-a documentary film about Brandis' creation of the first Universal Nut Sheller then known as the Malian Peanut Sheller
Universal Nut Sheller used to dehusk Jatropha Nuts (2008) Video about Mali Biocarburant's use of the UNS to promote Jatropha curcas cultivation to generate income for poor farmers in Mali (West Africa).

Appropriate technology
Sustainable agriculture
Jatropha
Peanuts
Coffee production